Paul Désiré Trouillebert (1829 in Paris, France – 28 June 1900 in Paris, France) was a famous French Barbizon School painter in the mid-nineteenth and the early twentieth centuries.

Life and career

Trouillebert is considered a portrait, and a genre and landscape painter from the French Barbizon School. He was a student of Ernest Hébert (1817–1908) and Charles Jalabert (1819–1901). He made his debut at the Salon of 1865, at the age of 36, and between  1865 and 1872, he exhibited at least one portrait at the Salon.

By the 1860s, his interests were shifting towards landscape painting. At the Salon of 1869, he exhibited Au Bois Rossignolet, a landscape painting that was more aligned with his interest in landscapes and received critical acclaim for it. He went on to execute many landscapes that are very close to Corot's late manner of painting. Indeed, the artist first came to public attention when one of his landscapes was sold to Alexandre Dumas’s son as a work by Corot in a celebrated forgery incident. In order to increase the sale value of the work, Trouillebert's signature had been erased and replaced with Corot's signature. In reality, while Trouillebert's landscapes are very similar to Corot, they exhibit their own distinct style.

Trouillebert never confined himself to any single genre. He was a skilled at portraits, landscapes, still-lifes and other subject matter. He was also interested in Orientalist themes and produced paintings of Eastern nudes. He painted a portrait of a half-nude young woman in an ancient Egyptian style of the Greco-Roman Dynasty. He called it Servante du harem (The Harem Servant Girl). In 1884, his painting of nudes, The Bathers was well received by the Paris Salon.

Selected works
 Cleopatra & the Dying Messenger, Lightner Museum, St. Augustine, Florida, 1873.
 Servante du harem (The Harem Servant Girl), 1874
 Femme en robe bleue rêvant. Private collection
 Chemin au bord du lac de Nantua, Galerie Gary-Roche	
 Deux lavanderies sous les bouleaux, Van Ham Fine Art Auctions (Van Ham Kunstauktionen)	
 La Gardienne de Troupeau, Frances Aronson Fine Art, LLC	
 Le Loir et la Flêche, Stoppenbach & Delestre	
 Le Pêcheur et le Bateau, Daphne Alazraki	
 Mme. Trouillebert, The Darvish Collection, Inc.
 Au Bord de La Loire à Montsoreau
 Diana Chasseresse (Diana the Huntress), private collection.

References

1829 births
1900 deaths
Painters from Paris
19th-century French painters
French male painters
19th-century French male artists